Sulaimon Akeem Omolade (born 15 December 1985) is a Nigerian professional footballer who plays as a defensive midfielder for Greek club Panserraikos.

Career
Omo previously played with Montenegrin club FK Mogren in the Second League of FR Yugoslavia, Macedonian First League club FK Pobeda and Greek clubs Egaleo, Ilisiakos, Panionios, Tyrnavos.

References

Living people
1985 births
Yoruba sportspeople
Sportspeople from Kwara State
Nigerian footballers
Association football midfielders
FK Mogren players
FK Pobeda players
Egaleo F.C. players
Ilisiakos F.C. players
Panionios F.C. players
PAE Kerkyra players
PAS Lamia 1964 players
Levadiakos F.C. players
Panserraikos F.C. players
Super League Greece players
Nigerian expatriate footballers
Nigerian expatriate sportspeople in Montenegro
Expatriate footballers in Serbia and Montenegro
Nigerian expatriate sportspeople in North Macedonia
Expatriate footballers in North Macedonia
Nigerian expatriate sportspeople in Greece
Expatriate footballers in Greece